Virac, officially the Municipality of Virac, is a 1st class municipality and capital of the province of Catanduanes, Philippines. According to the 2020 census, it has a population of 76,520 people.

It is most populous and fifth largest in land area in Catanduanes.

History

Pre-Spanish period
Civilization first touched the island province of Catanduanes in the thirteenth century, with the arrival of the scions of ten Bornean datus who were then traversing through the islets of the Philippine Archipelago. By the middle of the fourteenth century, organized communities could be seen throughout Catanduanes – a consequence of the rapid development of Southeastern Luzon initiated by the Malay settlers.

Virac, the capital town of the island province of Catanduanes, started its primitive annals in pre-Spanish times when tribal chieftain Lumibao, scion of Datu Dumaguil who came to the Philippines with the 10 Bornean datus and his wife Milbigan settled near Vidak spring and founded the first civilized settlement with a score of servant followers and their wives.

Spanish period
It was the Spanish conquistador Juan de Salcedo who first brought Spanish galleons to the waters of Catanduanes in 1573. His purpose then was to capture and punish pirates who carried on their nefarious trade in Camarines Sur, Sorsogon and Western Catanduanes.  His galleon returned a few weeks later – this time, his mission was to spread the Catholic faith.

While at bay, the port guard saw smoke rising from the mountain Eli. After dropping anchor, the Spaniards tracked down footprints from the shore which reached a sitio called Vidak. They eventually came upon a large kaingin in Timbean, situated between the barangays of Danicop and Calatagan.

The chieftain of the village had his hut built a little above a spring which still exists today. There was a reception hall conveniently shaded by a tree known as sambong. This tree eventually served as the guidon to the couple's place.

It is said that the Spaniards could not approach the hut of the chieftain because of three huge fierce-looking dogs and several guards who had their spears drawn toward the foreigners. However, the Spaniards determined to succeed in their mission, returned the threatening acts of the natives with gesture of friendship.

A piece of “onchita” was offered to the chieftain as a gift; but this was rejected by the chieftain when his wife said “we have many pieces of gold in our kingdom”. A silver piece was next offered, but this was similarly rejected by the chieftain and his wife. Reaching for some refined sugar, the Spaniards let the natives taste the sweetness of the substance. The chieftain's wife liked the taste. Thus begun the “sweet” relation between the natives and the Spaniards.

Soon after the first encounters, the Spaniards started giving the natives provisions not found in the chieftain's hut, such as more sugar and clothing. After the seed of friendship had taken roots, the Spaniards began spreading their message of Christianity. Lumibao was baptized as Jose and Milbigan as Maria. Their son, who lived at the bank of Macacao, was converted to Christianity with the name of Mariano.

Records regarding the Christianization of Virac were lost, reportedly due to vandalism by the Moros. The history of this capital town began to be accurately recorded only from the year 1755.

Moro raids
Catanduanes was not spared from the adventurous and plunderous raids of the Moros from Mindanao. But knowing the strength of the coastal batteries of the Virac harbor, the vintas divided into groups and landed at various places or points farther from the range of the coastal batteries. Some landed at Cadaculaan and others way out to points east and west of Virac.

Don Matias Soliman, a famous Moro fighter, engaged in battle and killed a Moro Datu named Mohammed Abu after a bloody encounter in sitio Hopog of Barrio Santo Domingo, Virac. He was aided by the swift-handed and hoarse voiced Don Alipio Alejandro alias Paas.

The non-Christian invaders were superior in arms and number until Don Alipio, with an exotic force, turned the tide. The Moros could not move further, hence, they retreated in defeat.

On the eastern end of Virac, the Moros succeeded in gaining a beach-head in Catanduanes and from there, attacked the town from the east. The Cabeza de Barangay of Francia, Don Pedro Tolentino alias Pantino, lost no time in giving their all against the enemy. This was the first time the people of Virac totally and successfully resisted an organized invasion.

American occupation

A few months after Emilio Aguinaldo, the first president of the First Philippine Republic took his oath of allegiance to America after losing in the Philippine–American War, a battleship dropped anchor in Virac.  The American soldiers were on a mission to expedite the surrender of the local Revolutionists or Katipuneros. Not eager to relinquish their hard-fought freedom, the Katipuneros refused to recognize the sovereignty of the United States and fled to the mountains.

In the later part of 1898, when Don Leon Reyes was the incumbent Capitan Municipal [town mayor] of Virac, the revolutionary troops who refused American Administration, came down from the mountains to rally for the common cause.  Don Leon Reyes readily welcomed the revolutionists and financed their cause in fighting the Americans.  This state of affairs was tactfully handled by the Capitan who spent almost all of his fortunes for the cause.  For his patriotic zeal, he was manacled, chained and sentenced to hard labor by the Americans in 1901.

The American occupation ended in 1934 before the establishment of the Philippine Commonwealth in 1935.

Japanese Invasion
Catanduanes was not spared by the forces of the Kamakura Regiment.  Airborne planes were cited at the southern portion of Virac in the morning of December 12, 1941, while vessels dropped anchor near Nagngangang Buaya Point, Cabugao Bay. At 9:30 in the morning of said day, towns were totally evacuated. Bombs were soon strategically dropped.

Later, garrisons were established in town and the municipal building was also used as a garrison. No school was regularly opened during the Japanese Occupation. Guerrilla organizations came and went.

Liberation
The Liberation of Catanduanes took place in what is now the municipal building and the Virac Parish Church area. On February 8, 1945, the battle started at Km. 4 at Barangay Calatagan at about 12 noon, and ended with the Filipino soldiers of the 5th, 52nd, 53rd, 55th, 56th and 57th Infantry Division of the Philippine Commonwealth Army and recognized guerrillas taking full control of the Japanese barracks.

On April 20, 1945, Florencio Tacorda, the only three-term Municipal President, some two and a half decades before the war, was designated mayor of Virac. He served for six months and twenty-five days during the Philippine Civil Affairs Unit regime.

Pre and Martial Law Era
From 1958 to 1970, Salvador Surtida took over followed by Jorge Arcilla from 1970 to 1986, two of the longest reigning local executives in the history of Virac. This period witnessed the ascendancy to national prominence of the Alberto brothers, Juan, Jose and Vicente, who doubtlessly brought progress and influenced the massive physical transformation of the municipality when Salvador Surtida and Jorge Arcilla were mayors. Foremost among the many infrastructure projects were the Catanduanes State Colleges and the Eastern Bicol Medical Center which placed Virac in the map as a major educational and health center in the Bicol Region.

The growth of Virac in terms of governance peaked in 1972. From the original 34 barangays in 1960, Virac was able to establish 29 new communities to upgrade to the present composition of 63 barangays.

EDSA Revolution and beyond
The EDSA Revolution in 1986 which toppled down the more than two decades of Marcos regime had a domino effect on the political structure of Virac. The replacement of the elected officials by appointed officials was in accordance with the Freedom Constitution which predominated during the revolutionary government from 1986 to 1992. Rodulfo Sarmiento, a doctor by profession held the reins of the municipal government.

The early nineties saw the alternate changing of local governance between Rodulfo Sarmiento and Jose "Cito" Alberto II, the son of Congressman Jose Alberto.

Geography
The municipality of Virac occupies the southern tip of the island province. It has a total land area of 18,778.4 hectares. Of its total, 9,359.15 hectares or 49.84% is forestland while 9,419.25 hectares are classified as alienable and disposable.

Almost half of the area is rugged and mountainous, with hills and plains dotted with marshy land, rocky jutting cliffs and crags.

The town is bounded on the east and south by the Pacific Ocean, on the north by high and green mountain ranges of San Miguel, and on the west by the gently rolling hills of San Andres.

Climate

Virac has a Type II climate. It has no dry season and an average precipitation of between 2,500 and 3,000 mm/annually.

Virac's position in the middle of the typhoon belt means that it is heavily affected by typhoons from July to October.  The region's dependence on agriculture means that economic development has always been hampered by these weather disturbances.

Barangays
The growth of Virac in terms of governance peaked in 1972. From the original 34 barangays in 1960, Virac established 29 new communities to increase the number of barangays to the present 63 barangays.

Demographics

Religion
Catholicism is a deeply rooted institution in this town with 98% of the people embracing the faith. Virac is the seat of an independent diocese of Catanduanes with Bishop Manolo Delos Santos, D.D., at the helm. The town was once a vicarship of Caceres and later, the Diocese of Legazpi. The patron of the town is the Immaculate Concepcion with the feast day celebrated on December 8.

Economy

The economy of Virac is sustained primarily by agriculture - the farming of rice, corn, bananas and root crops. The production of copra and abaca also provide additional income for the people. Its annual income in 1979 was a little more than ₱980,000.00 and the projected income for 1990 is more than a million pesos. Fishing is also an essential industry, together with mining and lumber. Lately, some home industries have been established while other sources of income are business and employment from the government and private sectors.

This capital town has a total land area of 0.30 hectares devoted to industrial undertakings with the exception of the unused 11.2 hectares in Palnab classified as industrial area in the 1978 Official Land Use Plan and the 20-hectare declared site of the proposed Provincial Agro-Industrial Center at Casoocan. Manufacturing and processing activities are dominated by micro-industry enterprises. Of the existing industries, furniture making, being primarily wood-based, faces the gravest threat of extinction due to global concern for forest protection and conservation.

Rice is the single biggest monocrop culture planted in an aggregate area of 1,019 hectares which is about thirty three percent of the total lowland agricultural land area.  Three hundred seventy five hectares are devoted to vegetables production. Upland farms are essentially utilized for cash crops such as abaca, tubers and coconut.  Vegetables and other food crops are raised in the low lands on mostly seasonal basis.

For 2011, annual harvests approximate 7,849 MT of palay, 3.00 MT of vegetables,  59.75 MT of corn, 7.98 MT of root crops, 1.6 MT of legumes and other perennial crops 5.445MT. Unprocessed abaca fiber and copra represent the major export products.

In 2012, Virac's locally generated income reached ₱32.6 million, with total income (including IRA) at ₱117.9 million.

The five major income sources:
 Services
 Agriculture
 Tourism
 Cottage Industry
 Manufacturing

Transportation

Virac is served by the Virac Airport. The town also have a seaport.

References

External links

 
 [ Philippine Standard Geographic Code]
 
Philippine Census Information

Municipalities of Catanduanes
Provincial capitals of the Philippines